The 2019–20 season is Universo Treviso Basket's 8th in existence (6th after the re-foundation) and the club's 1st season in the Lega Basket Serie A after the promotion in the top flight of Italian basketball.

Overview 
Treviso qualified to the Serie A after ending the 2018–19 Serie A2 Basket in second position and winning the qualification playoffs.

The 2019-20 season was hit by the coronavirus pandemic that compelled the federation to suspend and later cancel the competition without assigning the title to anyone. Treviso ended the championship in 13th position.

Kit 
Supplier: Erreà / Sponsor: De'Longhi

Players

Current roster

Depth chart

Squad changes

In

|}

Out

|}

Confirmed 

|}

Coach

Unsuccessful deals 
The following deal never activated and the player's contract was withdrawn before the beginning of the season.

Competitions

Serie A

References 

2019–20 in Italian basketball by club